Luigi Bertoni (1872–1947) was an Italian-born anarchist writer and typographer.

Bertoni fought on the Huesca front with Italian comrades during the Spanish Revolution and was, with Emma Goldman, one of the outspoken critics of anarchist participation in the Republican government after the Spanish Civil War.

References

External links
 Luigi Bertoni Papers at the International Institute of Social History

1872 births
1947 deaths
Anarchist writers
Italian anarchists
Writers from Milan